Egon Rusch (born 18 September 1928) was an Austrian boxer. He competed in the men's middleweight event at the 1960 Summer Olympics.

References

External links
  

1928 births
Possibly living people
Austrian male boxers
Olympic boxers of Austria
Boxers at the 1960 Summer Olympics
Sportspeople from Vorarlberg
People from Bregenz District
Middleweight boxers
20th-century Austrian people